Nyíregyháza is a city with county rights in northeastern Hungary and the county capital of Szabolcs-Szatmár-Bereg. With a population of 118,001, it is the seventh-largest city in Hungary and the second largest in the Northern Great Plain region. Its development has been ongoing since the 18th century, making it the economic and cultural center of the region. Nyíregyháza Zoo, with over 500 species, is recognized throughout Europe.

Geography 
Nyíregyháza is located in Szabolcs-Szatmár-Bereg County in the northern Plain region, which also comprises Hajdú-Bihar County and Jász-Nagykun-Szolnok County. It is located in the center of Nyírség as an agricultural town. The boundaries of the city are often understood as a very broad frame, because generally the near suburbs are included in them. It is located at the intersections of routes 4, 41, 36, and 38, making the city easy to reach, lying at the crossroads to Sub-Carpathia and Transylvania.

Climate

History
The first written mentions of Nyíregyháza date back to 1209, although it was then called simply Nyír ('birch'), after the Nyírség, the greater region in which the city lies. A source from 1326 mentions that by then the city already had a church, hence the second part of the name, egyház (meaning 'church'). By the middle of the 15th century, the town had about 400 inhabitants. In the 16th century, during the Turkish occupation of Hungary, Nyíregyháza became deserted; it was resettled only in the 1630s–1640s.

After the War for Independence led by Prince Francis II Rákóczi, the town's population increased. Most new settlers were Slovaks from the area of Békéscsaba. In 1786, Nyíregyháza was granted the right to hold four market days a year; by this time the town was the biggest in the county, with 7,500 inhabitants. In the early 19th century, Nyíregyháza was wealthy enough to secure freedom from its feudal lords, the Dessewffy and Károlyi families. During these prosperous years, the town got a new town hall, a hospital, several schools, and a restaurant by nearby Sóstó lake ("Salty Lake").

The town's inhabitants took an active part in the revolution and war for independence in 1848–49, and after the suppression of the revolution, several were imprisoned, among them the mayor, Márton Hatzel.

In the second half of the 19th century, Nyíregyháza became more and more urbanized, and in 1876, became the seat of Szabolcs County (now part of the larger integrated county Szabolcs-Szatmár-Bereg). In 1858, the railroad line reached Nyíregyháza; several new buildings were built, including a telegraph office, the main post office, and the theater. In 1881 the population consisted of 24,102 people, of which 13,534 were Hungarians, 8,678 Slovaks, 389 Germans and 1,501 of other ethnicities. In 1911, the tramway network was complete. After the grim years of World War I and the Hungarian–Romanian War, Nyíregyháza remained under Romanian occupation for ten months. Between the two world wars, the city celebrated the 100th anniversary of its independence from feudal landowners.

During World War II, Jews were used as forced laborers by Hungarians. After the German invasion, more than 6,000 of the city's Jewish inhabitants were deported to Auschwitz. After the war, 2,000 Hungarians were sent to Soviet labor camps (colloquially called malenky robot, or "little work"). Several buildings were destroyed, too, including the Status Quo Synagogue, whose front wall was preserved and is now displayed in Nyíregyháza's Jewish Cemetery.

A monument in the memory of the Holocaust victims was constructed in 2004.

From the 1960s, the city grew and developed quickly. Today, Nyíregyháza is one of the most prosperous cities in Hungary, serving as both a center of education and a popular tourist destination. It is known for having a bar in every street.

Nyíregyháza is the birthplace of Israeli artist Zeev Kun, who was born here in 1930.

Population
With a population of 118,001, Nyíregyháza is the seventh-largest city in Hungary.

Economy 
After the fall of Communism, several foreign-owned companies appeared in the city. In the early 2000s, the largest employers were Hübner Flextronics Ltd. and Hirsch's, but during the period of economic recession, many companies eliminated several thousand jobs. Today, the largest public companies are the Lego Manufacturing Kft. and the Michelin Hungaria Abroncsgyártó Kft., providing employment for about 3,000 people.

Religion 
 Roman Catholic: During the 2011 census, 25,132 people, or 20.1% of the population, identified themselves as being Roman Catholic (8,365 fewer than in the 2001 census). The city is co-seat of the Diocese of Debrecen-Nyíregyháza.  The church owns St. Emeric Catholic High School, Primary School and College and a kindergarten in the city.
 Greek Catholic: During the 2001 census, 12,742 people, or 10.6% of the population, identified themselves as being Greek Catholic (6,303 less than in 2001). The city is the seat of the only Hungarian Greek Catholic bishopric, the Diocese of Hajdúdorog. The Co-Cathedral of the Nyíregyháza St. Nicholas Greek Catholic Cathedral, other churches in the city: Jósaváros Greek Catholic Church, Nyíregyháza-Örökösföld Holy Trinity Greek Catholic Church, Nyíregyháza-Borbánya Mother of God Greek Catholic Church, Fox Mountain St Stephen's Chapel (Sóstóhegy), Nyírszőlős Birth of the Mother of God Greek Catholic Church, Nyíregyháza-Oros Protection of the Theotokos Greek Catholic Church, Rozsrétszőlősi Greek Catholic chapel. Here you will find the country's only Greek Catholic institution of higher learning, the St. Athanasius Greek Catholic Theological College. Other religious educational institutions include St. Nicholas Greek Catholic Kindergarten, Primary and Secondary School, Nicholas Soja Greek Catholic Primary School and Nursery (Huszar Colony).
 Reformed: During the 2011 census, 19,662 people, or 16.4% of the population, identified themselves as belonging to this religion (5,956 less than in 2001). The city is part of the East Hungarian Reformed Church District. Churches in the city are the Nyíregyháza City Reformed Church Temple, Nyíregyháza-Garden City Reformed Church Church of Nyíregyháza-Sóstói Reformed Church church Orosi Reformed Church Temple. Also maintained by the Church are the Jókai Reformed Primary School, Magdaléneum - Reformed Disability Nurse, Nursing Home, Mustard Seed Nursery, Kálvineum Nursing Home.
 Lutheran: During the 2011 census, 8,391 people, or 7% of the population, identified themselves as belonging to this religion (3,970 less than in 2001). Because of the city's Szabolcs Hajdu-diocese headquarters, especially in the 18th century Nyíregyháza újranépesítő tirpákok are important in the tradition of the Church. In 1947, the Hungarian-Slovak population exchange greatly contributed to the decrease in the number of believers. The denomination of the oldest and largest local church in the Nyíregyháza Lutheran Church Great Church, other churches: Evangelical small church, Nyíregyháza-Garden City Augsburg Confession Lutheran Church meetinghouses, Nyíregyháza Lutheran Church III. area Borbánya church Rozsrétszőlősi Bethlehem Lutheran church, the church Nyírszőlős Lutheran Church. The College of Nyíregyháza Budapest Protestant Theological University mel pricing religious cooperation is going well. Maintained by the Church's educational institutions: Lajos Kossuth Nyíregyháza Lutheran High School, Zoltan Turóczy Protestant English Bilingual Primary School and Nursery. The institution of the Emmaus Lutheran Church Charity Home Church also.
 Orthodox: During the 2011 census, 127 people declared themselves as belonging to this religion. The St George the Martyr Orthodox chapel falls under the Hungarian Orthodox Diocese.

Transportation 
National road traffic to Budapest goes through the M3 motorway and four national highways (4, 36, 38, 41) and the lower state roads, other cities of the country and the settlements of Szabolcs-Szatmár-Bereg county. Szabolcs Volán Zrt. Launches long-haul flights to major cities in the region and to larger towns in the country.

Due to the nature of the city junction, Nyíregyháza's road network is heavily loaded. The city center is surrounded by a 2X2-lane "highway". And the narrow city center is bordered by the "small boulevard", the northern, eastern and southern parts of which have already been completed. The M3 motorway, which recently reached the city, will hopefully reduce traffic and congestion on roads passing through the city center. At the same time the motorway reached the city, the east bypass (main road 403) was opened, allowing those traveling between Budapest and Záhony to avoid the city. Those coming to Debrecen no longer have to cross the city. The Nyíregyháza ring road includes the already completed 403 road and the M3 motorway south of the city. The missing parts of the ring road are Highway 338 (already authorized, but with an unknown construction date) in the west and the northern sector.

The most important of its railway connections is the 100 electric tram line between Szolnok and Záhony, from where the number 80 line to Tokaj, 113 line to Mátészalka and 116 line to Vásárosnamény branch out. Nyíregyháza is the final stop of the Ohat-Pusztakócs-Nyíregyháza railway line, which provides passenger traffic to Tiszalök. Next to the station are the Nyírvidék small railway to Dombrád and Balsa, which closed in December 2009. Nyíregyháza is one of the busiest railway stations in the country. There are InterCity flights to Budapest every hour to Debrecen and Miskolc. Nyíregyháza welcomes visitors to the city in a new and modern station building.

Tourist sights 

Nyíregyháza also has several museums and exhibitions, showing the city's rich cultural heritage.

 Collection of the International Medallion Art and Small Sculpture Creative Community of Nyíregyháza-Sóstó – periodic exhibitions of works of contemporary artists

Politics 
The current mayor of Nyíregyháza is Ferenc Kovács (Fidesz-KDNP).

The local Municipal Assembly, elected in the 2019 local government elections, is made up of 22 members (1 mayor, 15 individual constituency MEPs and 6 compensation List MEPs) divided into the following political parties and alliances:

List of mayors since 1990

Sports 
The city is home to Hübner Nyíregyháza BS, a First division basketball team that plays its home games at the Continental Arena.

The Rally Hungary is a rally race headquartered in Nyíregyháza that is part of the European Rally Championship since 2019.

Twin towns – sister cities

Nyíregyháza is twinned with:

 Baia Mare, Romania
 Bielsko-Biała, Poland
 Harbin, China
 Iserlohn, Germany
 Kajaani, Finland
 Kiryat Motzkin, Israel
 Prešov, Slovakia
 Rzeszów, Poland
 Satu Mare, Romania
 St Albans, England, United Kingdom
 Uzhhorod, Ukraine

Notable residents
 
 
Gyula Benczúr - painter
Márton Fucsovics - professional tennis player
Dániel Gazdag - footballer
Miklós Kállay
Gyula Krúdy
György Mitró
Gábor Nógrádi - author, screenwriter, playwright, essayist, publicist and poet

Broadcasting

References and notes
References

Notes

Further reading 

 Bronze Age settlement and a former Sarmatian burial ground discovered in Nyíregyháza

External links

 Official site 
 Sóstó Thermal Bath 
 Sóstó Zoo 
 Nyíregyházi Hírportál - hírek - news 
 A portal site 
 Index-Kelet - local news 
 Happy Art Festival site in English
 Bronze Age settlement and a former Sarmatian burial ground discovered in Nyíregyháza
 Nyíregyháza at funiq.hu 
 Restaurant, bar, pub, daily menu & gastro guide from Nyíregyháza 

 
County seats in Hungary
Cities with county rights of Hungary
Populated places in Szabolcs-Szatmár-Bereg County